The Argentine Olympic Committee or COA ( - COA) is the National Olympic Committee representing Argentina's athletes in the International Olympic Committee (IOC), the Pan American Games and the South American Games.

It is based in Buenos Aires.

History
The COA was created by the president of Argentina Marcelo T. de Alvear in 1923 and recognized by International Olympic Committee in the same year.

Presidents

See also
 Argentina at the Olympics
 Argentine Paralympic Committee
 Argentina at the Pan American Games

References

External links
  

Argentina
Argentina at the Olympics
Ol